Williams Murray Hamm (WMH) is a brand innovation, design and strategy agency based in London. It specialises in inventing or reinventing brands.

History 
Founded in 1997, Williams Murray Hamm was acquired in 2006 by Loewy Group, a business that was subsequently acquired by Writtle Holdings in 2011. Chairman & Founder, Richard Williams and Creative Partner, Garrick Hamm both remain on the board of directors. Founding Partner, Richard Murray died in 2010. Wybe Magermans was appointed to the board in 2016 and became the agency's Managing Director in 2019.

Work and accolades 
WMH's work in Fast-moving Consumer Goods (FMCG) packaging for GSK's Horlicks, Hovis, McVitie's Jaffa Cakes and Sainsbury's SO organics and Sainsbury's Basics led to the business being named Design Agency of the Year by Marketing Magazine in 2002 and 2004.

WMH has won DBA Design Effectiveness Awards for its work on Here Organics, Sainsbury's SO organic, Wild Brew (which also won a D&AD yellow pencil), while Hovis and Clipper Teas won the DBA Design Effectiveness Grand Prix in 2002 and 2004 respectively.

Notable WMH clients have included 2003's redesign of the Barclays Bank identity, 2004's relaunch for Fortnum & Mason, via a brand book and repackaging exercise.  The company has maintained an eight-year relationship with Syngenta, the Swiss agrochemicals business. Other WMH clients include Beazley Group, Brummells of London, Way to Blue and Jamie Oliver's store Recipease venture, Burger delivery start-up Chosen Bun, Magic Me, JuiceBurst (Purity Soft Drinks), Syngenta, charity Ella's Home, and globally for Carlsberg and Castrol.

More recent work includes the launch of Waitrose & Partners Free From range of foods, creation of completely new container shipping company, Ocean Network Express (ONE), brand positioning and identity redesign for USA based food producer Lamb Weston; and brand world creation for Pernod Ricard's leading boutique single malt whisky, Aberlour.

In 2015, the agency was awarded the top prize at The Drum's inaugural Dream Awards and gold at the Fresh Awards for its packaging design for UK erotica brand Coco de Mer. Additionally, WMH won gold in the body category at the celebrated Pentawards for its work with beauty brand Prismologie.

2016 saw WMH's return to win gold at the Design Effectiveness Awards (Design Business Association) for their interactive brand design work with JuiceBurst (Purity Soft Drinks). The award-winning continued for its brand identity and packaging work for Coco de Mer winning the coveted D&AD Yellow Pencil Award, the Drum Design Award, Design Week Award (Package Design Category) and Creative Review Annual where it was awarded 'Best in Book: Design'.

In 2017, WMH started a new division that specialises in implementing large packaging roll-out and major cross-media campaigns. WMHAdaptive works for clients such as Waitrose, Castrol and Network Rail.

Publications 
 WMH updated The Little Book of Don'ts in Brand Design in 2004 
 Richard Murray wrote Churnmore A True Taste of Brand Management in 2007
 The three partners delivered Seemed Like a Good Idea at the Time, a celebration of the company's ten years in business in 2009
To celebrate its 20th anniversary, WMH published Blood, Sweat & Ideas. A retrospective of the agency's work over the past two decades.

References

External links 
 Williams Murray Hamm website

Design companies of the United Kingdom
Design companies established in 1997
British companies established in 1997
1997 establishments in England